Grainville Cricket Ground is a cricket ground in Saint Saviour, Jersey.

History 
The first recorded match held on the ground came in 1988 when Jersey played the Hampshire Second XI.  Jersey have used the ground since then and it has held a number of international tournaments, including matches in the 2008 World Cricket League Division Five which was won by Afghanistan, and more recently the 2010 European Cricket Championship Division One, which Jersey won.  The ground also hosted four matches for a combined Channel Islands team when it was permitted to take part in the English Minor counties MCCA Knockout Trophy competition in 2001 and 2002.

The most notable matches held on the ground came in 2002 when the England women's cricket team played a Women's One Day International Tri-Series against New Zealand Women and India Women.

References

External links
Grainville Cricket Ground at ESPNcricinfo
Grainville Cricket Ground at CricketArchive

Cricket grounds in Jersey
Saint Saviour, Jersey